Afrikan Nikolayevich Krishtofovich (November 8, 1885 – November 8, 1953) was a Soviet geologist, paleobotanist and botanist. His name is abbreviated as "Krysht." when attributing him as the author of botanical names.

He was a fossil hunter specializing in Mesozoic flora. In 1932 he published his book Geological review of the countries of the Far East.

A crater on Mars was named in his honor. The craters name was approved in 1982 by what is now known as VSEGEI.

References

1885 births
1953 deaths
People from Pavlogradsky Uyezd
Corresponding Members of the USSR Academy of Sciences
Odesa University alumni
Academic staff of Saint Petersburg State University
Academic staff of Ural State University
Stalin Prize winners
Recipients of the Order of the Red Banner of Labour
Botanists with author abbreviations
Paleobotanists
Botanists from the Russian Empire
Geologists from the Russian Empire
Paleontologists from the Russian Empire
Soviet botanists
Soviet geologists
Soviet paleontologists
Burials at Serafimovskoe Cemetery